Pool C of the 2010 Women's Rugby World Cup was composed of 2006 World Cup semi-finalists France and Canada, Scotland and Sweden.

Canada vs Scotland

Touch judges:
David Keane (Ireland)
Debbie Innes (England)
Fourth official:
Will Halford (England)
Fifth official:
Paula Carter (England)

France vs Sweden

Touch judges:
David Keane (Ireland)
Debbie Innes (England)
Fourth official:
Will Halford (England)
Fifth official:
Rebecca Patrick (England)

France vs Scotland

Touch judges:
Sarah Corrigan (Australia)
Kerstin Ljungdahl (Germany)
Fourth official:
Andrea Ttofa (England)
Fifth official:
Sarah Cox (England)

Canada vs Sweden

Touch judges:
Nicky Inwood (New Zealand)
Debbie Innes (England)
Fourth official:
Alan Biggs (England)
Fifth official:
Catherine Lewis (England)

Scotland vs Sweden

Touch judges:
Javier Mancuso (Argentina)
Sébastien Minery (France)
Fourth official:
Moira Pritchard (England)
Fifth official:
Jane Pizii (England)

Canada vs France

Touch judges:
Javier Mancuso (Argentina)
Debbie Innes (England)
Fourth official:
Ed Turnill (England)
Fifth official:
Catherine Lewis (England)

Pool C
2010–11 in French rugby union
2010–11 in Scottish rugby union
2010 in Canadian rugby union
2010 in Swedish women's sport
2010 in Canadian women's sports
2010 in French women's sport